The Geelong-Korea are a professional baseball team in the Australian Baseball League. The team is based in the city of Geelong, Victoria and the team's home ground is Geelong Baseball Park. Geelong-Korea were one of two expansion teams added to the ABL for the 2018–19 season. All professional members of the team are Korean. In their inaugural season they finished fourth place in their division with a record of 7 victories and 33 losses.

Current roster

See also

Sport in Australia
Australian Baseball
Australian Baseball League (1989–99)
List of current Australian Baseball League team rosters

References

External links 
 
 Australian Baseball League website

Australian Baseball League teams
Baseball teams in Australia
Baseball teams established in 2018
2018 establishments in Australia
Diaspora sports clubs in Australia
Sport in Geelong
Sports teams in Victoria (Australia)
Asian-Australian culture